Lecithocera contracta is a moth in the family Lecithoceridae. It was described by Edward Meyrick in 1918. It is found in southern India.

The wingspan is 11–13 mm. The forewings are rather dark fuscous. The discal stigmata are cloudy and blackish, the second transverse. The hindwings are grey.

References

Moths described in 1918
contracta